Ira Forest Stanphill (February 14, 1914 – December 30, 1993) was a well-known American gospel music songwriter of the mid-twentieth century.

Early years
Ira Stanphill was born in Bellview, New Mexico. Stanphill's parents were Andrew Crittenton Stanphill and Maggie Flora Engler Stanphill. He and his family spent most of his younger years in Coffeyville, Kansas. He was saved when he was 12, and he graduated high school in 1932. He was called to preach soon after graduating Chillicothe (Missouri) Junior College at age 22.

Ministry
On April 28, 1939, the Southern Missouri District Council of the Assemblies of God ordained Stanphill to the gospel ministry.

Churches
Stanphill began preaching when he was 22., first in a summer traveling ministry with Christian Ambassadors of the Assemblies of God, then becoming director of youth and music at a church in Breckenridge, Texas. He later became music director at Faith Tabernacle in Oklahoma City, then became pastor of Trinity Assembly of God in Orange, California. In the early 1940s, he served as associate pastor at Full Gospel Tabernacle in Bakersfield, California. In 1949, he became music director at Bethel Temple in Fort Worth, Texas.

In 1956, he was the founding pastor of Bethel Assembly of God Church in Lake Worth, Florida. In September 1962, he became pastor of the Assembly of God Church in Lancaster, Pennsylvania. In 1968, he was pastor of Rosen Heights Assembly of God Church in Fort Worth, Texas where he oversaw the construction of a new building and the re-naming of the church to Rockwood Park Assembly of God. After serving 13 years as pastor of Rockwood Park, he resigned to devote more time to evangelism and concerts.

Evangelistic activities
Stanphill was an evangelist, traveling to churches and Bible camps around the country, sometimes accompanied by his wife. They played and sang some of his compositions in addition to his preaching. In 1941, they joined the team of evangelist Raymond T. Richey. An ad for a crusade Stanphill held in 1964 described him as "Preacher of Old Time Religion." In addition to traveling throughout the United States, he preached in 40 other countries.

Occasionally as part of his crusades, he would ask members of the congregation to suggest titles for songs. Selecting one title from the suggestions, he would write words and music for a song during the service.

Broadcasting
In the 1970s, Stanphill's ministry included a 30-minute weekly television program originally produced in 1973 by the Christian Broadcasting Network at KXTX-TV (channel 33) in Dallas and later called "Young at Heart" produced by WCFC in Chicago. In the 1990s, he appeared on several Southern gospel music videos produced by Bill Gaither. Those episodes (and others) included some of Stanphill's songs.

Book
Stanphill was the author of the book This Side of Heaven.

Movie
The independent film "This Side of Heaven" based on Ira Stanphill's life, was produced in 1987 and was shot in and around the Dallas, Texas area.

Music
By the age of 10, Stanphill had already become a fluent musician, having learned to play the piano, organ, ukulele, and accordion. He went on to learn to play xylophone, guitar, saxophone, and clarinet. At 17, he was composing and performing his own music for church services, revival campaigns, and prayer meetings.
 
As a singer evangelist, Stanphill traveled the United States and Canada extensively and around the world to 40 countries over his career to preach and perform his music.  Many famous secular singers have performed his works, such as Elvis Presley ("Mansion Over the Hilltop") and Johnny Cash ("Suppertime"). "I Know Who Holds Tomorrow", "I Walk with His Hand in Mine", and "We'll Talk It Over" are a few of his titles that are familiar and still performed today.
 
Stanphill composed more than 500 gospel songs. Recordings of his composition Mansion Over the Hilltop sold more than 2 million copies, and some of his songs have been translated into other languages.  “Room at the Cross” is still sung and is in many hymnals.

Stanphill founded Hymntime Publishers, Inc., and was the company's president.

Songs by Ira Stanphill

Source: Christian Copyright Licensing (CCLI) website, searched 6 March 2018

Honors
Stanphill was inducted into the Gospel Music Hall of Fame (GMA) in 1981, and the Southern Gospel Music Association (SGMA) Hall of Fame in 2001. He also received an honorary PhD from Hyles-Anderson College in Hammond, Indiana.

Family
On April 23, 1939, Stanphill married Zelma Lawson, a minister's daughter who "played piano by ear and accompanied her parents on a local radio program." That marriage ended in divorce October 7, 1948. Stanphill and Zelma had a son, Ray. On June 7, 1951, following Zelma's death in an automobile accident, he married his second wife, Gloria Holloway. They had two daughters, Judy and Cathy.

Brain tumor
In 1976, Stanphill was diagnosed with "a malignant tumor in the right front quadrant of the brain." He underwent successful surgery, living for 17 more years.

Death
Stanphill died of a heart attack December 30, 1993, in Overland Park, Kansas, less than two months shy of his 80th birthday. He was interred in Johnson County Memorial Gardens, Johnson County, Kansas.

References

 Baxter, Mrs. J. R. and Videt Polk. Biographies of Gospel Song Writers. Dallas, Texas: Stamps-Baxter Music & Printing Company, 1971, pp. 19–21.
 Osbeck, Kenneth W. 101 More Hymn Stories. Grand Rapids, Michigan: Kregel Publications, 1985, pp. 231–232.
 Reynolds, William Jensen Companion to Baptist Hymnal. Nashville, Tennessee: Broadman Press, 1976, pp 434.

External links
 Biography on HymnTime.com
 Ira F. Stanphill GMA Hall Of Fame

1914 births
1993 deaths
20th-century composers
Gospel music composers
People from Curry County, New Mexico
Southern gospel performers
Musicians from New Mexico
Musicians from Kansas
People from Coffeyville, Kansas